The Enforcement Act of 1870, also known as the Civil Rights Act of 1870 or First Ku Klux Klan Act, or Force Act (41st Congress, Sess. 2, ch. 114, enacted May 31, 1870, effective 1871) was a United States federal law that empowered the President to enforce the first section of the Fifteenth Amendment throughout the United States. The act was the first of three Enforcement Acts passed by the United States Congress in 1870 and 1871, during the Reconstruction Era, to combat attacks on the voting rights of African Americans from state officials or violent groups like the Ku Klux Klan.

The Enforcement Act of 1870 prohibited discrimination by state officials in voter registration on the basis of race, color, or previous condition of servitude. It established penalties for interfering with a person's right to vote and gave federal courts the power to enforce the act. 

The act also authorized the President to employ the use of the army to uphold the act and the use of federal marshals to bring charges against offenders for election fraud, the bribery or intimidation of voters, and conspiracies to prevent citizens from exercising their constitutional rights.

The act banned the use of terror, force or bribery to prevent people from voting because of their race. Other laws banned the KKK entirely. Hundreds of KKK members were arrested and tried as common criminals and terrorists. The first Klan was more or less eradicated within a year of federal prosecution.

Provisions
This act consists of 23 sections, some of which have been more notable than others.

Section 2 states that no person may be disenfranchised “on account of race, color, or previous condition of servitude".  Any person or government official who violates this provision must be fined at least five hundred dollars, and at the discretion of the court, can be sentenced to jail for a period of one month up to one year.

Section 3 states that the President of the United States had full rights to use the United States Armed Forces and state militias to put down any rebellions which took place as a result of these acts, or to disable any freedmen.

Section 4 states that the habeas corpus would be suspended. A writ of habeas corpus is an important right granted to individuals of America. It is a judicial mandate which requires prisoners to be brought to court in order to determine whether the government has the right to continue to imprison them. The habeas corpus was suspended only twice, during the American Civil War and the Reconstruction era.

Section 5 states that jurors in the United States courts must not be involved in any conspiracies, and are required to swear that they didn't have any allegiances to any groups which were aiming and dedicated to overthrow the government or act in deny and constitutional rights given to citizens.

Section 6 states that if any two or more people work together to deliberately violate the act, or to intimidate any citizen with intents to prevent and restrict one's freedom, they will be charged with a maximum fine of $5,000, and a maximum prison sentence of ten years, at the discretion of the court. Also, they will be ineligible and prohibited from holding any office, place of honor, profit or trust which were created by the United States Constitution or the laws of the United States.

Sections 14 and 15 enforced section three of the Fourteenth Amendment to the United States Constitution, by instructing federal prosecutors to use a writ of quo warranto to remove people from government offices who were disqualified by that third section of the constitutional amendment.  Reasons for such disqualification include insurrection or rebellion against the United States; holding office contrary to such disqualification became a misdemeanor.  These portions of the Enforcement Act were repealed in 1948.  However, even after that repeal in 1948, there remained a federal statute initially contained in the Confiscation Act of 1862 which made insurrection a federal crime, and disqualified insurrectionists from various government offices.

Legislative history 
The act developed from separate legislative actions in the House and Senate. H.R. 1293 was introduced by House Republican John Bingham from Ohio on February 21, 1870, and discussed on May 16, 1870. S. 810 grew from several bills from several Senators. United States Senator George F. Edmunds from Vermont submitted the first bill, followed by United States Senator Oliver P. Morton from Indiana, United States Senator Charles Sumner from Massachusetts, and United States Senator William Stewart from Nevada. After three months of debate in the Committee on the Judiciary, the final Senate version of the bill was introduced to the Senate on April 19, 1870. The act was passed by Congress in May 1870 and signed into law by United States President Ulysses S. Grant on May 31, 1870.

See also
 Posse Comitatus Act of 1878
 Second Enforcement Act

U.S. Attorneys General during Reconstruction
 Ebenezer R. Hoar – 30th Attorney General, served 1869–1870
 Amos T. Akerman – 31st Attorney General, served 1870–1871
 George Henry Williams – 32nd Attorney General, served 1871–1875
 Edwards Pierrepont – 33rd Attorney General, served 1875–1876

U.S. Secretary of War during Reconstruction
 William W. Belknap – 30th Sec. of War, served 1869–1876

References

Bibliography

Further reading

External links
 
 "Reconstruction Timeline," Towards Racial Equality: Harper's Weekly Report on Black America, 1857-1874

Anti-discrimination law in the United States
History of African-American civil rights
Reconstruction Era legislation
United States federal civil rights legislation
United States federal criminal legislation
41st United States Congress